Liliana Gramberg (July 8, 1921 – March 21, 1996) was an Italian-born American printmaker and painter.

Life and career
Gramberg was born Treviso, Italy in July 1921. She attended the University of Rome, before moving to California in 1950 on a Fulbright scholarship, at the California College of Arts and Crafts. Gramberg also studied at the École Supérieur des Beaux-Arts in Paris. She was known for her abstract work in printmaking which she also taught at Trinity College in Washington, D.C. She organized exhibitions of the art of Martin Puryear and Sam Gilliam at Trinity College. Gramberg died in Washington, D.C. on March 21, 1996, at the age of 74.

Collections
Ashmolean Museum of Art
British Museum
Library of Congress
Museo Reina Sofia
Smithsonian American Art Museum
National Gallery of Australia

References

1921 births
1996 deaths
20th-century American women artists
Artists in the Smithsonian American Art Museum collection
Italian emigrants to the United States
Trinity Washington University faculty